Christopher Martyn (c. 1617 – 26 January 1678) was an English politician who sat in the House of Commons  variously between 1646 and 1660. He fought in the Parliamentary army in the English Civil War

Martyn was a gentleman of Plympton and became a captain in the parliamentary army. In April 1644 he was commanding the Plymouth garrison and attacked the Royalists at New Bridge taking 200 prisoners. Two days later he repulsed a counter-attack and chased the Royalist cavalry to Plympton Bridge near where their army was stationed.

In 1646, Martyn was elected Member of Parliament for Plympton Erle in the Long Parliament.  He resumed his seat in the Rump Parliament  after Pride's Purge  with some hesitation. In 1653 he was nominated as one of the representatives for Devon in the Barebones Parliament. He was elected as MP for Plympton Erle again in 1659 for the Third Protectorate Parliament, and was re-elected for Plympton Earle in 1660  in the Convention Parliament. 
 
Martyn  married Jane Snelling who brought him property at Plympton.

References

 

1617 births
1678 deaths
Roundheads
Members of the Parliament of England for Plympton Erle
English MPs 1640–1648
English MPs 1648–1653
English MPs 1653 (Barebones)
English MPs 1659
English MPs 1660

Churchwardens
English justices of the peace
Mayors of places in Devon
Members of the Parliament of England (pre-1707) for Devon